Planica 1935 was a ski jumping event held on 17 March 1935 in Planica, Drava Banovina, Kingdom of Yugoslavia. Total of 12,500 people have gathered in the competition.

Schedule

Competition
On 13 March 1935 unofficial training was held with only three jumpers performing in a couple of rounds: Marusarz, Novšak and Norbert Knobloch. The longest jump of the day was at 87 metres.

On 14 March 1935 first official training with many competititors at start. Reidar Andersen set the world record in his third attempt at 93 metres.

On 15 March 1935 second official training was on schedule with three world records: Stanisław Marusarz landed at 95 metres and Reidar Andersen at 98 and 99 metres.

On 17 March 1935 there was an international competition in three rounds and the winner was Polish Stanisław Marusarz.

Unofficial training
13 March 1935 — chronological order of jumps not available

First official training
11:00 AM — 14 March 1935 — chronological order

Second official training
Morning — 15 March 1935 — chronological order of jumps not available

International competition

11:30 AM — 17 March 1935 — Two rounds — chronological order

 World record! Fall or touch!

Official results

International competition

Ski jumping world records

References

1935 in Yugoslav sport
1935 in ski jumping
1935 in Slovenia
Ski jumping competitions in Yugoslavia
International sports competitions hosted by Yugoslavia
Ski jumping competitions in Slovenia
International sports competitions hosted by Slovenia